The Weilerskopf is a hill, 470 metres high, in a wooded exclave of Herxheim am Berg northwest of the German town of Bad Dürkheim. Its summit is the site of a transmission tower owned by Deutsche Telekom.

Transmission tower 
The Weilerskopf transmission tower is a standard telecommunications tower, or Typenturm, built in 1969.

Gebetsfelsen 

The Gebetsfelsen is a rock formation on the Weilerskopf. It is a 7-metre-long, 4-metre-wide and only 1.4-metre-high monolith made of sandstone. Twelve steps have been cut into the sandstone, probably in Roman times. A Roman quarry is located in the vicinity of the Gebetsfelsen.

Sources 

Mountains and hills of Rhineland-Palatinate
Mountains and hills of the Palatinate Forest
Bad Dürkheim (district)